Gornja Trešnjica is a village in the Ljubovija municipality, Mačva District of Central Serbia. The village had a Serb ethnic majority and a population of 291 in 2002.

Historical population

1948: 660
1953: 662
1961: 616
1971: 490
1981: 434
1991: 344
2002: 291

References

See also
List of places in Serbia

Populated places in Mačva District
Ljubovija